Promised Works is a compilation album by The For Carnation, released in 1997 by Runt Records.

Track listing

Personnel 
Adapted from the Promised Works liner notes.

The For Carnation
 John Herndon – drums
 Doug McCombs – bass guitar
 Brian McMahan – vocals, guitar
 Michael McMahan – guitar (4–9)
 David Pajo – guitar (1–3)
 John Weiss – drums (4–9)

Production and additional personnel
 Grant Barger – engineering
 Andrew Bonacci – arrangement (1–3)
 John Golden – remastering
 Gordon Jenkins and his Orchestra – arrangement, strings (4–9)
 London Symphony Orchestra – strings (1–3)
 Brad Wood – engineering (1–3)

Release history

References

External links 
 

1997 compilation albums
The For Carnation albums
Touch and Go Records compilation albums